James Bab is an adventure story arc of the Philippine comic strip series Pugad Baboy, created by Pol Medina Jr. This particular story arc lasts 38 strips long and was published in the Philippine Daily Inquirer from June to July 1997. In 1998, the story arc was reprinted in the tenth compilation of the comic strip series, named Pugad Baboy X. The title itself is an obvious play on James Bond, with resident hippie Bab as the main character.

Synopsis
The arc starts with Bab commenting on the adventure and intrigue of being a secret agent, using Arnold Schwarzenegger's character in the movie True Lies as an example. Along the way, he points out some situations that secret agents face:

 Lying to one's own family. Tomas brings a drunk Bab home to his mother after a long binge. Bab claims that they went to watch Volcano starring Pierce Brosnan.
 Assuming disguises. Bab is seen wearing a cowboy costume while inquiring for pornographic titles at a video shop.
 Creating alibis on the fly. A backpack-carrying Bab is about to ride a provincial bus with a sword-wielding Mao stopping him from boarding. He reasons that he was going to the bank to withdraw money to pay his debt.

Soon enough, Polgas comes in and tells him that someone is looking to hire him as a secret agent. He changes to Dobermaxx on the spot. Polgas then explains that the first thing a secret agent wannabe does is to create a name that is so appealing even if the agent himself performs dismally on the job. Bab goes off-panel and comes back wearing a business suit and his hair combed. He then introduces himself as "Bab. James Bab," with the "James Bond Theme" as background music. Bab reveals his secret agent gear, such as a blowgun improvised from a ball-point pen that shoots monggo seeds, and a blowtorch to help him get out of handcuffs.

Bab's secret agent training begins with Polgas teaching him the basics of tradecraft and hand-to-hand combat. However, Polgas lands in the hospital for several days after Bab broke wind on his face during a close-quarter combat session. In the meantime, martial arts grandmaster Ernesto Presas will be Bab's trainer. Bab is skeptical of his abilities, but finds things out the hard way when he is confined alongside Polgas after a session with Presas.

Three weeks later, Bab has completed his training and Polgas assigns him his first mission: to stake out a certain coconut vendor. He begins to complain, but takes the mission dossier anyway after Polgas offered him another training session with Presas regarding how to block a kris sword.

Bab's first day sees him indirectly looking at the coconut vendor via a reflection in a heavily tinted window. However, an Ilocano-speaking security guard accosts him and they begin an informal conversation about the rigours of the job. It is revealed that the window Bab looked at was that of a bank. Unknown to both of them, a robbery was already in progress. Disappointed with the outcome of the initial surveillance, Bab goes home, changes clothes, and turns on the television just as a news program comes on air. He does not pay attention, as the show reports a robbery at the same bank where he chatted with the security guard. Worse, the guard himself has been arrested as a suspected accomplice.

Bab then embarks on the second day of the stake out. The danger of discovery forces him to watch on the vendor from inside a restaurant, which is located across the street from the bank. He orders a drink and goes under the table to get a bag of cashew nuts to keep him busy. However, just as he is getting the food, two people suddenly occupy his table. One of them, Brawlio, boasts about how easy it was to rob the bank with the help of the second man, branch manager Jimmy Tontolino. Bab looks on as Brawlio gives Tontolino a black bag containing his PHP 2.5-million share of the PHP 8-million loot under the table. That night, an incensed Tontolino calls Brawlio about the contents of the bag given to him. It is revealed that Bab switched the bags during the covert exchange, allowing him to bring home the money and for Tontolino to get his gear instead.

Elated at having acquired such a massive pile of money, Bab boasts that he could buy a BMW with all the cash - and changes it to VW when Polgas suddenly appears to debrief him.

After he is told everything that happened in the past two days (and catches Bab trying to pocket some of the money as one pile disappears), Polgas hatches a plan to attract the robbers' attention. Bab will come to the bank and pretend to be a boisterous depositor. He indeed attracts a lot of attention and soon enough, Tontolino comes over and asks him to leave. Bab drops hints about the money and later ushered into the manager's office. When Tontolino tries to explain that the money was "his," Bab suddenly fumes, saying in Tagalog, "So Mr Jimmy Tontolino, you really do have a lot of cash! Did you rob a bank?" and walks out lamenting about the manager's poor service. Tontolino then alerts Brawlio about Bab and tails him. Polgas shadows both of them aboard the Thunderdog. Bab arrives at a safe house with Tomas already inside. Tontolino then gives Brawlio the location and recommended that he bring his entire posse along, as he sees a lot of weapons stacked in the dining room.

The ten-man gang then arrives. Brawlio recommends that they storm the house immediately but an associate refuses, claiming that it could be a trap. Brawlio, citing the dumb goon stereotype in Philippine movies, still insists on the assault. The aide's suspicions are then confirmed when the coconut vendor, known as Estong, comes forward and says he recognized Bab from the stakeout. The group decides to split up. Now that the cat was out of the bag, Polgas springs Bab and Tomas into action.

Polgas orders the Thunderdog on "herd mode" to cover the south side of the house while Tomas and Bab are respectively given the north and east sectors to find and capture the robbers. He will handle the western area. The Thunderdog's AI takes over and blocks a group of robbers attempting to escape. It forces them to run but they cannot shoot back at it because the cost of repairing a Porsche is beyond their means. Polgas learns that Bab got the robbers in his zone because he used a stack of pornographic playing cards to get their attention. Tomas calls in and reports that he had trapped the three robbers in his sector by pointing his Minigun at them while their backs are against a wall. Polgas then bumps into Brawlio and Tontolino after he takes out two accomplices using his arnis sticks. Brawlio promptly locks Polgas in a bear hug, claiming that he is the Anaconda's relative, but let's go after Polgas says he is related to Mike Tyson. The confusion allows him to get his Garapata Gun and shoot the two. After securing them, Polgas links up with Tomas to get his captives, who are shaken with fear after Tomas destroys (off-panel) much of the wall with a massive barrage of fire. Only the section immediately behind them is left standing, and the ground in front of them is bordered by dozens of bullet holes. Tomas feigns innocence despite the fact that the Vulcan gun's barrels are still smoking.

Polgas and Tomas go and meet Bab, who just organised an auction of his pornographic cards with Estong as the auction master and a bunch of dirty old men as the bidders.

Polgas then deduces that a recent series of robberies against the bank's customers were made possible because Estong used his business as a spotter for the suspects. The group opts to remain silent about where the rest of the money is stashed away. Since they would not talk, Polgas tries one last tack...

He orders that the suspects be herded aboard the van they used as a getaway vehicle, so they can ride to a certain overpass in Quezon City. The group finally gives in and says that the money was in Brawlio's house after Polgas says the following words (in Tagalog): "Even if they are in handcuffs, we can make it appear that there was a shoot-out." Tomas is also more than enthusiastic to carry out the execution, whistling as he wipes his Minigun.

The guard is eventually cleared of the charges now that the true suspects are behind bars. He then points out to Bab and company that Jimmy Tontolino was already a no-gooder and "has no hemorrhoids (read: perfect asshole)" He treats the gang to a drinking session just outside the cell where Brawlio and company are detained. Bab laments that there was one item that he didn't use during his time as James Bab - his blowgun/ballpen, which he uses to snipe the prisoners with mongo shots. His drinking buddies begin to take turns shooting.

Pop culture references

 Due to his drunken stupor, Bab forgets that Brosnan did not star in Volcano, but in Dante's Peak. The film, together with Volcano and Anaconda, were already released in theaters in June 1997.
 Polgas' threat to have the bank robbers killed is eerily reminiscent of the alleged circumstances behind the Kuratong Baleleng rub-out case in 1995. Philippine Senator Panfilo Lacson was investigated over the case that year as chief of the Presidential Anti-Crime Commission's Task Force Habagat (Monsoon). The case was eventually dismissed in late 2012 and affirmed by the Supreme Court in March 2013.   
 Polgas' claim about being a relative of Mike Tyson is a reference to The Bite Fight, which already happened during the time that the story arc was published.
 Miniguns normally have six barrels. Tomas' version has seven.
 Brawlio's remarks about dumb goons are indeed a common occurrence in Philippine action movies. Medina explained it further in a series of strips published in Pugad Baboy 6, which tackled typical clichés that are usually present in Philippine-made movies.
 Ilocano-speaking characters would come back again in the 2000 story arc Private Investigator!. The Ilocano here is the security guard of the robbed bank, while on the latter, the Ilocano was Kainam's father.

Bibliography
Medina, Pol Jr. Pugad Baboy X, Pol Medina Jr Novelties, 1998.

References

Pugad Baboy